The sign of the horns is a hand gesture with a variety of meanings and uses in various cultures. It is formed by extending the index and little fingers while holding the middle and ring fingers down with the thumb.

Religious and superstitious meaning 

In Indian classical dance forms, it symbolizes the lion. It is commonly found on depictions of Gautama Buddha. It is also found on the Song dynasty statue of Laozi, the founder of Taoism, on Mount Qingyuan, China.

An apotropaic usage of the sign can be seen in Italy and in other Mediterranean cultures where, when confronted with unfortunate events, or simply when these events are mentioned, the sign of the horns may be given to ward off further bad luck. It is also used traditionally to counter or ward off the "evil eye". With fingers pointing down, it is a common Mediterranean apotropaic gesture, by which people seek protection in unlucky situations (a Mediterranean equivalent of knocking on wood).

In Italy and other parts of the Mediterranean region, the gesture must usually be performed with the fingers tilting downward or in a leveled position not pointed at someone and without movement to signify the warding off of bad luck; in the same region and elsewhere, the gesture may take a different, offensive, and insulting meaning if it is performed with fingers upward or if directed aggressively towards someone especially in a swiveling motion (see section below). 

The sign of the horns is used during religious rituals in Wicca, to invoke or represent the Horned god.

In LaVeyan Satanism, the sign of the horns is used as a traditional salutation, either for informal or ritual purposes.

Offensive gesture
As previously stated above, in Italy and certain other Mediterranean countries, the sign, often when pointing downwards, but occasionally also upwards, can serve also as a talismanic gesture to ward off bad luck. However, the positioning of the hand sign and the context in which it is used generally renders obvious to Italian and other Mediterranean people the meaning of the sign in a particular situation. During a European Union meeting in February 2002, Italian prime minister Silvio Berlusconi was photographed performing in a jocular manner the offensive “cornuto” version of  gesture behind the back of Josep Piqué, the Spanish foreign minister.

Northwestern European and North American popular culture

Contemporary use by musicians and actors
There is a 1927 recording by The New Orleans Owls, "Throwin' The Horns", on 78 rpm, Columbia 1261-D. It has a humorous vocal by two of the band members.
Ike Turner told in an interview that he used the sign in his piano playing on Howlin' Wolf's blues song "How Many More Years" in 1951.

Marlon Brando makes the sign whilst singing "Luck Be a Lady" in the 1955 film Guys and Dolls, seeming to indicate it was a sign for snake eyes in the craps game he is playing for the gamblers' souls.

The 1969 back album cover for Witchcraft Destroys Minds & Reaps Souls on Mercury Records by Chicago-based psychedelic-occult rock band Coven, led by singer Jinx Dawson, pictured Coven band members giving the "sign of the horns". According to a Facebook post by Dawson, she used the sign as early as late 1967 when Coven started, to which she posted a photo showing her giving the sign on stage.

On the cover of the Beatles' Yellow Submarine album (1969), the cartoon of John Lennon's right hand is making the sign above Paul McCartney's head. Some fans interpreted this as one of the many supposed "Paul is dead" clues. Some may think it is possible that the cartoonist misrepresented the sign for "I love you", which is very similar and more in keeping with the band's public message and image. However, the 1969 cartoon is based on many photos of John Lennon making the hand sign in 1967. One of these photos of Lennon doing the hand sign appears on the cover of a Beatles single release shortly after, making it the first time the hand sign appears on a rock release.

The sign is also used in various Disney movies. It can be seen in the medieval-style opening sequence of the 1971 British-American Disney movie Bedknobs and Broomsticks, when a goat-legged figure with a jester's cap who is leading a procession of outlandish-looking figures, flashes the sign.

Beginning in the early 1970s, the horns were known as the "P-Funk sign" to fans of Parliament-Funkadelic. It was used by George Clinton and Bootsy Collins as the password to the Mothership, a central element in Parliament's science-fiction mythology, and fans used it in return to show their enthusiasm for the band. Collins is depicted showing the P-Funk sign on the cover of his 1977 album Ahh... The Name Is Bootsy, Baby!.  

Frank Zappa can be seen jokingly making the gesture in the 1979 film Baby Snakes in response to the audience, commenting, "That's right, spindle twice".

In the 1985 film The Breakfast Club, Richard "Dick" Vernon is the grumpy vice principal of Shermer High School and the main antagonist of the film. One of his most famous lines is "Don't mess with the bull young man, you'll get the horns"; in the parody film Not Another Teen Movie Vernon's character appears in a scene where he flashes the sign of the horns while rotating his wrist, a call back to the line from The Breakfast Club.

For the 2016 Indian movie Rock On 2, the "2" in the title is stylized with the sign of the horns, with the two extended fingers representing "2".

Heavy metal culture
Ronnie James Dio was known for popularizing the sign of the horns in heavy metal. He claimed his Italian grandmother used it to ward off the evil eye (which is known in Italy as malocchio). Dio began using the sign soon after joining the metal band Black Sabbath in 1979. The previous singer in the band, Ozzy Osbourne, was rather well known for using the "peace" sign at concerts, raising the index and middle finger in the form of a V. Dio, in an attempt to connect with the fans, wanted to similarly use a hand gesture. However, not wanting to copy Osbourne, he chose to use the sign his grandmother always made. The horns became famous in metal concerts very soon after Black Sabbath's first tour with Dio. The sign would later be appropriated by heavy metal fans.

Geezer Butler of Black Sabbath can be seen "raising the horns" in a photograph taken in 1969. The photograph is included in the CD booklet of the Symptom of the Universe: The Original Black Sabbath 1970–1978 compilation album. This would indicate that there had been some association between the "horns" and heavy metal before Dio's popularization of it.

When asked if he was the one who introduced the hand gesture to metal subculture, Dio said in a 2001 interview:

Gene Simmons of the rock group KISS attempted to claim the "devil horns" hand gesture for his own. According to CBS News, Simmons filed an application on June 16, 2017, with the United States Patent and Trademark Office for a trademark on the hand gesture he regularly shows during concerts and public appearances—thumb, index, and pinky fingers extended, with the middle and ring fingers folded down (like the ILY sign meaning "I love you" in the American Sign Language). According to Simmons, this hand gesture was first commercially used—by him—on November 14, 1974. He is claiming the hand gesture should be trademarked for "entertainment, namely live performances by a musical artist [and] personal appearances by a musical artist." Simmons abandoned this application on June 21, 2017.

The Japanese kawaii metal band Babymetal uses the kitsune sign, their own variation of the sign of the horns, symbolizing their personal deity, the Fox God. The middle, ring finger, and thumb join at the tips to form the snout, the extended index and pinky fingers are the ears. This gesture is similar in appearance to the salute of the Turanist Grey Wolves movement.

Electronic communication
In text-based electronic communication, the sign of the horns is represented with the \../, \m/ or |m| emoticon and sometimes with /../. The Unicode character U+1F918 🤘 SIGN OF THE HORNS was introduced in Unicode 8.0 as an emoji, on June 17, 2015.

Gang hand signal

The "sign of the horns" hand gesture is used in criminal gang subcultures to indicate membership or affiliation with Mara Salvatrucha. The significance is both the resemblance of an inverted "devil horns" to the Latin letter 'M', and in the broader demonic connotation, of fierceness and nonconformity.

Sports culture

Hook 'em Horns is the slogan and hand signal of the University of Texas at Austin. Students and alumni of the university employ a greeting consisting of the phrase "Hook 'em" or "Hook 'em Horns" and also use the phrase as a parting good-bye or as the closing line in a letter or story.  The gesture is meant to approximate the shape of the head and horns of the UT mascot, the Texas Longhorn Bevo.

Fans of the University of South Florida Bulls use the same hand sign at their athletic events, except that the hand is turned around and facing the other way.  With the middle and ring finger extending towards the person presenting the "Go Bulls" sign.

Fans of North Dakota State University Bison athletics also use a similar hand gesture, known as "Go Bison!"  The pinky and index fingers are usually slightly bent, however, to mimic the shape of a bison's horns.

Fans of North Carolina State University Wolfpack athletics use a similar gesture with the middle and ring fingers moving up and down over the thumb to mimic a wolf's jaw.

Fans of University of California, Irvine Anteaters use a similar sign with the middle and ring fingers out to resemble the head of an anteater.

Fans of University of Nevada, Reno Wolf Pack athletics use a similar sign with the middle and ring fingers out to resemble the wolf's snout. 

A variation of this hand gesture is also used in the professional wrestling industry, which fans dub the "Too Sweet". It was possibly innovated by Scott Hall and the other members of The Kliq based on the Turkish Grey Wolves (organization) organization hand gesture according to Sean Waltman, and has since been attributed to other wrestling groups such as the nWo and Bullet Club, as well as individual wrestlers such as Finn Bálor.

Fans of University of Utah athletics, particularly football and gymnastics, use a gesture where the index and pinky finger are straight and parallel to each other, forming a block "U."

Fans of Northwestern State University Demon athletics also use a similar hand gesture, known as "Fork 'em!" The pinky and index fingers are extended but a little more parallel to each other resembling the horns on a demon.

Arizona State University Sun Devil fans make a pitchfork sign by extending the index and middle fingers, as well as the pinky. The thumb holds down the ring finger to complete the gesture.

Fans of the Wichita State University Shockers frequently hold up their middle finger in addition to the pointer and pinky fingers as a reference to the comic sexual act.

Fans of the Grand Canyon University Antelopes use this hand gesture with a slight variation by touching the tips of the ring and middle finger with the thumb to form the shape of an antelope and its horns. Often followed by the phrase "Lopes up".

Fans of the Universidad de Chile soccer team use this gesture to represent their support for the team by forming a U-shaped hand gesture, often followed by the phrase "Grande la U".

Fans of University at Buffalo Buffalo Bulls athletics use the same hand sign at their athletic events. This gesture is meant to resemble a bull's horns.

See also 
 Cornicello
 ILY sign is sometimes confused with this gesture because many users tend to do the "horns" improperly by extending their thumb.
 Shaka sign

References

External links

 
 President George W. Bush, gestures the "Hook 'em, horns," the salute of the University of Texas Longhorns.(...)
 Odyssey of the Devil Horns: Who is responsible for bringing metal's famous hand signal to the tribe? Los Angeles CityBeat, September 9, 2004

Hand gestures
Heavy metal subculture
Superstitions of Italy
Symbols
Mediterranean